Heavenly Days is a 1944 film starring Fibber McGee and Molly. It was the third and final feature film to feature the popular radio characters; unlike the two previous entries, none of the radio show's supporting cast members appeared in this film except the show's house vocal quartet, The King's Men.

Cast

 Jim Jordan as Fibber McGee
 Marian Jordan as Molly McGee
 Eugene Pallette as Senator Bigby
 Gordon Oliver as Dick Martin
 Raymond Walburn as Mr. Popham
 Barbara Hale as Angie
 Don Douglas as Dr. George Gallup
 Frieda Inescort as Ettie Clark
 Irving Bacon as Tower, the Butler
 The King's Men as Soldier Quartet
 Emory Parnell as Detective

Reception
It lost $205,000 at the box office.

See also
List of American films of 1944

References

External list

Film review at Variety

1944 films
1944 comedy films
American comedy films
American black-and-white films
Films based on radio series
RKO Pictures films
Films scored by Leigh Harline
1940s English-language films
1940s American films